The 2018 season was the Arizona Cardinals' 99th in the National Football League, their 31st in Arizona, and their only season under head coach Steve Wilks. During the off-season, State Farm purchased the naming rights to the Cardinals' home stadium and it was renamed from University of Phoenix Stadium to State Farm Stadium. Although former head coach Bruce Arians retired before the season began, he came out of retirement on January 8, 2019 to become the new coach of the Tampa Bay Buccaneers.

With a Week 14 loss to the Detroit Lions, the Cardinals had their first double digit loss season since 2012 and were eliminated from playoff contention for the third consecutive season. One highlight of the Cardinals' 2018 season was their first ever victory against the Green Bay Packers at Lambeau Field, which also resulted in the firing of Packers head coach Mike McCarthy after a nearly 13-year tenure. They finished the season 3–13, their worst record since 2000. The Cardinals also went 1–7 at home until it was broken four years later. Head coach Steve Wilks was fired the day after the season ended.

This was also the last full season under the ownership of Bill Bidwill, who died during the 2019 season.

Draft

Draft trades
 The Cardinals traded their fourth-round selection (115th overall), and their second-, fourth- and sixth-round selections in 2017 (45th, 119th and 197th overall) to Chicago in exchange for Chicago's second-round selection in 2017 (36th overall).
 The Cardinals were awarded one third-, one fourth- and one fifth-round compensatory pick (97th, 134th and 254th overall).
 The Cardinals traded their sixth-round selection (189th overall) to New Orleans in exchange for running back Adrian Peterson.
 The Cardinals traded their seventh-round selection (233rd overall) to Kansas City in exchange for cornerback Marcus Cooper.
 The Cardinals traded center Tony Bergstrom to Baltimore in exchange for Baltimore's seventh-round selection (238th overall). However, the trade was voided as the result of Bergstrom not meeting playing time conditions with the Ravens.

Undrafted free agents

Staff

Final roster

Preseason

Regular season

Schedule

Note: Intra-division opponents are in bold text.

Game summaries

Week 1: vs. Washington Redskins

Week 2: at Los Angeles Rams

Week 3: vs. Chicago Bears

Week 4: vs. Seattle Seahawks

Rosen's first start was a loss as the Seahawks kicked a game-winning field goal. The Cardinals started 0–4 for the first time since 1986 when they were in St. Louis. Coupled with wins by the Raiders and Texans, the Cardinals became the only winless team in the NFL.

Week 5: at San Francisco 49ers

Week 6: at Minnesota Vikings

Week 7: vs. Denver Broncos

Week 8: vs. San Francisco 49ers

The Cardinals swept the 49ers for the fourth consecutive season.

Week 10: at Kansas City Chiefs

Week 11: vs. Oakland Raiders

Week 12: at Los Angeles Chargers

Week 13: at Green Bay Packers

This was the first time the Cardinals defeated the Packers on the road since 1949 when the team was based in Chicago. It was also the first time they did so at Lambeau Field. After 12 years as head coach, Packers head coach Mike McCarthy was fired following this game.

Week 14: vs. Detroit Lions
Larry Fitzgerald passed Jerry Rice for most receptions with a single team in NFL history with 1,282 receptions.

This was the Cardinals first home loss to the Lions since 1993.

Week 15: at Atlanta Falcons

Week 16: vs. Los Angeles Rams

With the loss, the Cardinals fell to 3-12 and finished 1-7 at home, their worst in franchise history

Week 17: at Seattle Seahawks

With the loss, the Cardinals ended their season at 3–13 and were swept by the Seahawks for the first time since 2014.

Standings

Division

Conference

References

External links
 

Arizona
Arizona Cardinals seasons
Arizona Cardinals